Red Peak may refer to:

 Red Peak (El Dorado County, California), 
 Red Peak (Madera County, California)
 Red Peak flag, a proposed New Zealand flag
 Red Peak Formation, a geologic formation in Wyoming